Below is an incomplete list of feature films, television films or TV series which include events of the Yugoslav Wars. This list does not include documentaries, short films.

Croatian War of Independence in film

Bosnian War in film

Kosovo War in film

Uncategorized war films

Science fiction, fantasy, comedy, and horror films

Croatian War of Independence

Bosnian War

Kosovo War

Uncategorized war films

Television films

Croatian War of Independence

Bosnian War

Uncategorized war films

TV series

Croatian War of Independence

Bosnian War

Kosovo War

Uncategorized war TV series

Yugoslav Wars
Yugoslav Wars films